Gareth Cheeseman was a fictional salesman played by Steve Coogan in the episode "Dearth of a Salesman" of Coogan's series Coogan's Run.

The character is probably best remembered for his blue Ford Probe company car, which ends up being crushed at the end of the programme, and his Hugo Boss suit, which he cannot help but keep mentioning.

Cheeseman was a self-centred, egocentric and materialistic Computer Hardware (Fictitious Lancelot 2000 DRAM sound card) sales executive with virtually no redeeming features, and is generally regarded as the best (and most cringeworthy) of the Coogan's Run characters. He is perhaps best remembered for looking into his bathroom mirror at a Travel Inn motel and saying "You're a tiger! Grrrrrr!!!!!" and urging a client to sign a new sales contract, even though just seconds before the client had been informed of his son's suicide.

Of the characters portrayed by Coogan in the series, Cheeseman was the most similar to Alan Partridge. As well as looking more like Partridge than most of Coogan's characters, he had a similar self-obsession and arrogance coupled with failings in his daily work. As most of the Dearth of a Salesman episode is set in a hotel, it is similar in many ways to I'm Alan Partridge, where Partridge was forced to live in a low-budget hotel for six months. Other similarities include an episode in I'm Alan Partridge where Alan is on the verge of signing a lucrative contract when the other party dies just before signing. Alan uses the dead mans hand to sign the contract in any case.

References

External links

Fictional salespeople